The Rannamari was a Sea monster from Maldivian folklore that was believed to have raped and murdered thousands of young women.

Brief outline
According to Ibn Batuta's version of the story, the king,the king  , haunted the people of the Maldives and had to be appeased monthly with the sacrifice of a virgin girl. On the last day of every month, a lot was drawn by the authority of the king, among the women of the island. She was to be sent off to spend the night in a temple. Overnight, the king was to come. The following morning, the girls were found dead, and the islanders proceed with the burial rituals.

Common versions 

Rannamaari has two main versions, the traditional version and the one told by Ibn Batuta.

According to the Moroccan traveler Ibn Batuta, who visited the Maldives during his journeys through Asia,

{{quote |text = Rannamaari, the notorious sea demon haunted the people of the Maldives since time began. Every month, a virgin had to be sacrificed for the demon, or the people were to face his wrath. A girl was chosen from the inhabitants by the king or his advisers and she would be kept alone on the first night of the month in an isolated temple at the eastern seafront in Malé. At dawn, the girl's family would return to the temple to find the dead body of the girl. Maldivians were very worried about it till a Muslim traveler suggested that he be sent to the temple in the place of a girl to read verses of the Quran there.  After the traveler recited Quran in  the temple, the demon disappeared and was never heard of again.  Everyone was grateful that the demon disappeared and believed that Allah is the greatest of all and changed to shazan know as ((saneem babulho thin naashi))

However, it is now believed by most of the population as fact that the story of the sea demon had been fabricated by the then incumbent king, his advisors or religious leaders (this is academically wrong and bias to say that kings and his advisors fabricated this story. Why they say the story is not fabricated by the king or his advisors because the earliest coper plates during his sister's son reign did not mention the rannamaari story. So, the Rannamaari story is very late fabrication. Most probably two or three centuries after the first Muslim king).

But the motivation behind the fabrication is still unclear. Some people believe that the king or one of his advisers raped the girls for sexual pleasure and killed them afterwards. This can be true as only virgin girls were selected by the king or his advisers for the sacrifice.

See also 
Rihla
Xavier Romero-Frias, The Maldive Islanders, A Study of the Popular Culture of an Ancient Ocean Kingdom. Barcelona 1999,

References 

Myths of the Maldives
Jinn
Conversion to Islam
Islam in the Maldives
Sea monsters